Phillip Hayes Dean (January 17, 1931 – April 14, 2014) was an American stage actor and playwright.

Death
Hayes died on April 14, 2014, aged 83, in Los Angeles, California from an aortic aneurysm.

References

External links

1931 births
2014 deaths
Male actors from Chicago
American male stage actors
Deaths from aortic aneurysm
20th-century American dramatists and playwrights